The chancellor of the University of Illinois Urbana-Champaign is the principal administrative officer of the university and a member of the faculty of each of its colleges, schools, institutes and divisions. The chancellor is appointed by the Board of Trustees following nomination by the president of the University of Illinois System. The chancellor performs those duties that are assigned by the president and that are consistent with the actions of the Board of Trustees. The chancellor is assisted by vice-chancellors for academic affairs, administrative affairs, campus affairs, and research. Jack W. Peltason served as the first chancellor in 1967, and there have been 13 chancellors in total. The current chancellor is Robert J. Jones, who has held the position since September 26, 2015.

Before 1967, the president of the University of Illinois System served as the principal administrator of the original Urbana-Champaign campus. In June 1966, at the recommendation of president David D. Henry, the Board of Trustees switched to a chancellorship system of administration. The change established a new administrative office, the "Chancellor of the University of Illinois Urbana Champaign", and renamed the two administrators of the Chicago campuses, Vice president of the University of Illinois at the Medical Center (UIMC) and Vice president of the University of Illinois at Chicago Circle (UICC), to chancellor. The two Chicago campuses were later consolidated in 1982 to form the University of Illinois at Chicago.

List of chancellors

Timeline of chancellorships

See also
 List of chancellors of the University of Illinois Chicago
 List of chancellors of the University of Illinois Springfield
 List of presidents of the University of Illinois system

Notes

References

 
Illinois, University of, Urbana-Champaign
Illinois, University of, Urbana-Champaign
University of Illinois Urbana-Champaign